Within economics, the feasibility condition, along with the tangency condition, is used in microeconomics to solve the consumer choice problem and obtain the demand function. The condition states that total spending on all goods cannot exceed available income. The general form of the feasibility condition for two goods is as follows:

,

where x and y are the quantities consumed of the two goods, px and py are their respective prices, and I is the income of the consumer.

References

Consumer theory